An inchworm is the caterpillar of a Geometer moth.

Inchworm may also refer to:

"Inchworm" (song), a song from the film Hans Christian Andersen
Inchworm (toy), a ride-on toy manufactured by Hasbro in the 1970s
Inchworm motor, an electric motor patented by EXFO